Mynydd Llwydiarth is a mountain in southern Snowdonia, Wales. It is a long ridge running from a low summit to the south of Mynydd Dolgoed, running south-west to Mynydd Cymerau. Nant Llwydiarth rises on the south flank of the mountain, and on the west slope the Ratgoed slate quarry operated until 1946.

It is one of the Dyfi hills.

References

Mountains and hills of Snowdonia
Landmarks in Wales
Mountains and hills of Gwynedd
Mawddwy
Dyfi Hills